Mario Daniel Saralegui Iriarte (born 24 April 1959 in Artigas) is a Uruguayan football manager and former player who played as a midfielder.

Career
Having made his official debut on May 31, 1979 against Brazil (1-5), Saralegui obtained a total number of 24 international caps for the Uruguay national football team. He represented his native country at the 1986 FIFA World Cup, wearing the number sixteen jersey.

Saralegui played most of his career for Peñarol in Uruguay, the only Uruguayan team he ever played for. He won 6 Uruguayan Primera championships a Copa Libertadores and a Copa Intercontinental during his four spells with the club.

Saralegui played for a number of non-Uruguayan teams including Elche of Spain, River Plate and Estudiantes de La Plata of Argentina and Barcelona SC of Ecuador.

After retiring as a player, he had a spell as manager of Peñarol, where he led them to the Clausura 2008 championship with a 5-3 victory over River Plate de Montevideo in the championship playoff. In September 2020, he became the manager of Peñarol for the third time.

In politics
In May 2021, Saralegui assumed as Representative, taking the place of Valentina dos Santos.

Honours

Player
Peñarol
Uruguayan Primera División: 1978, 1979, 1981, 1982, 1985, 1993
Copa Libertadores: 1982
Intercontinental Cup: 1982

River Plate
Copa Libertadores: 1986
Intercontinental Cup: 1986

References

External links
 
 

1959 births
Living people
People from Artigas Department
Uruguayan footballers
Peñarol players
Elche CF players
Club Atlético River Plate footballers
Estudiantes de La Plata footballers
Expatriate footballers in Argentina
Barcelona S.C. footballers
Expatriate footballers in Ecuador
Uruguayan expatriate footballers
Uruguayan Primera División players
Argentine Primera División players
Association football midfielders
Uruguay under-20 international footballers
Uruguay international footballers
1979 Copa América players
1983 Copa América players
1986 FIFA World Cup players
Uruguayan football managers
Peñarol managers
C.D. El Nacional managers
Cerro Largo F.C. managers
Members of the Chamber of Representatives of Uruguay
Carlos A. Mannucci managers
C.A. Progreso managers
Juventud de Las Piedras managers
C.D. Olmedo managers